Rama Devi (born 1948) is an Indian politician from Bihar and belongs to Bhartiya Janata Party. She is on the Panel of chairpersons of the 17th Lok Sabha as of 2019.

Biography 
Rama Devi was born on 8 August 1948 at Lalganj in Vaishali district. She had studied Law and resides at Muzaffarpur. She was member of 12th Lok Sabha from Bihar during 1998-1999 from Motihari on RJD ticket.

She was first elected to 15th Lok Sabha in 2009 on the BJP ticket from Sheohar Lok Sabha constituency. She was elected for second time to Lok Sabha (16th) in 2014 . She is elected for third time to Lok Sabha (17th) in 2019. In 2019, she was in the midst of a controversy when Samajwadi Party's MP Azam Khan made some sexist remarks directed at her, for which he was forced to apologize.

References

1948 births
India MPs 1998–1999
India MPs 2009–2014
India MPs 2014–2019
Lok Sabha members from Bihar
Living people
Articles created or expanded during Women's History Month (India) - 2014
People from Muzaffarpur
Women in Bihar politics
People from Vaishali district
Bharatiya Janata Party politicians from Bihar
21st-century Indian women politicians
21st-century Indian politicians
20th-century Indian women politicians
20th-century Indian politicians
Women members of the Lok Sabha
Babasaheb Bhimrao Ambedkar Bihar University alumni
India MPs 2019–present
Rashtriya Janata Dal politicians
National Democratic Alliance candidates in the 2014 Indian general election
National Democratic Alliance candidates in the 2019 Indian general election